Multiple religious belonging, also known as double belonging, refers to the idea that individuals can belong to more than one religious tradition. While this is often seen as a common reality in regions such as Asia with its many religions, religious scholars have begun to discuss multiple religion belonging with respect to religious traditions such as Judaism, Christianity, and Islam.

Those who practice double belonging claim to be an adherent of two different religions at the same time or incorporate the practices of another religion into their own faith life. It is increasing with globalisation. One such example is a person attending a Christian church but also finding meaning in yoga and in forms of meditation inspired by Eastern traditions, and enjoying attending a Jewish Seder at Passover.

Context
In some religions such as Judaism, Christianity, and Islam, those who hold to an exclusivist understanding of religion see multiple religious belonging as problematic. This is in contrast with countries such as China, Japan, Korea, Vietnam, India, Nepal and Sri Lanka, whose cultures have a long history of being influenced by different religions. Moreover, in the postmodern period people tend to question their identity, because of the unlimited choices of religions, which leads to the difficulty in defining their identity.

Van Bragt showed that 79% of Japanese self-identify as Shintoists and 75% self-identify as Buddhists. The reason for the extremely high percentage of both religions is that many Japanese consider themselves as both Shintoist and Buddhist and do not consider it a problem to belong to more than one religion. (Whether this statistic is correct is arguable.) This phenomenon, according to Van Bragt, is a "division of labour". Van Bragt argued that the cause of this phenomenon is that, different from the Western concept of religion, Shinto and Buddhism in Japan are defined by their rituals and practices, not by their moral and social authority. Thus, the Japanese can belong to several religions that do not conflict with each other in terms of social and ethical issues.

Scholars such as Catherine Cornille, Peter C. Phan, Francis Xavier Clooney, Jan Van Bragt, Aloysius Pieris and Devaka Premawardhana have questioned the possibility of defining oneself into multiple religions. For these scholars, "religious belonging" is not an individual's subjective sense of a particular religion but rather, in Cornille's words, "the recognition of one's religious identity by the tradition itself and the disposition to submit to the conditions for membership as delineated by that tradition." For Cornille, the ultimate purpose of a scholarly discussion on multiple religious belonging is to transform one's religion through the understanding of other religions.

Types of approaches 
Based on Van Bragt's study, scholars have tried to investigate the possibility for adherents of a religion such as Christianity to belong to multiple religions. The approach to Christian multiple religious belonging, according to Devaka Premawardhana, can be divided into two trends: Peter Phan's approach based on a Christological ground, in which he emphasises on Christ's "asymmetrically superior status", and Francis Clooney's approach rooted in a methodological ground, which tries to cross boundaries into another religion just as religions must have discrete entities. These two approaches are summarised below.

Christological approach 
Phan's approach emphasised the assymmetricality in which Jesus is the Logos made flesh and the climax of God dealing with humankind. In an attempt to resonate with one's cultural identity and tradition, Phan explained that multiple religious belonging is necessary in order for practitioners of multiple belonging to treat other religions as a qualifier of their identity. This approach, according to Phan, does not deny one's Christian identity, which functions as substantive in relation to non-Christian religion. Phan noted that multiple religious belonging is not a new issue in the twenty-first century but rather the common form of life of the first-century Christians recorded in the book of Acts. In Phan's view, the disappearance of this trend was "a tragic loss to both Judaism and Christianity", because it led to a subsequent history of bitter hatred, especially from the side of Christianity.

Methodological approach 
As a comparative theologian, Clooney writes about the diversity in the world nowadays, especially with respect to the flourishing of different religions. For Clooney, reflecting on one's religion in this pluralistic world is necessary, so that we can "see the others in light of our own, and our own in light of the other." Focusing on the study of scriptural and theological texts, Clooney compares them between Christian traditions and non-Christian religions, to "cross boundaries" to other traditions, so that one would re-think their own theology, which would thus shape their identity. After more than 40 years of studying Hinduism, Clooney concluded that he finds the distinctive disciplines of theology and Hinduism are "mutually enriching". By applying this approach, according to Clooney, one can start within his or her "home" tradition, enter a different tradition and return to his or her tradition, which is enriched and reformulated after crossing boundaries.

Challenges and controversy 
While scholars studying multiple religious belonging attempt to appreciate other religions' traditions besides their own, the conservative segment of Christianity tends to question the inclusivistic view of multiple religious belonging because it implies that salvation can be found from somewhere else other than Jesus Christ. In a 2010 article, Veli-Matti Kärkkäinen, a systematic theologian, questioned the approach of "othering" those that have traditions different from Christians' because God is the one who offers salvation; Christians only witness it. It is out of humility that Christians can say that salvation belongs to God, and God only, in Kärkkäinen's view. On the other hand, scholars studying multiple religious belonging such as John B. Cobb see this as an opportunity rather than a threat: "I do not see multiple religious belonging as the primary way into the future. The primary way is the transformation of the particular religious traditions, at least in the Christian case, through their new encounter with other traditions." For Cobb, engaging in interfaith dialogue helps smooth the tension between Christianity and Judaism and avoid misunderstanding toward Islam.

In a 2017 article, sociologist Steve Bruce pointed out that most of the published writings in which multiple religious belonging is studied are purely conceptual and offer "only anecdotes to illustrate theoretical or classificatory discussions". Bruce argued that the few attempts to gather empirical data on the phenomenon have conflated a variety of different attitudes that should not be given the label of "multiple religious belonging", attitudes such as: universalistic re-interpretation of multiple religions, multiple religious association through family ties, multiple religious interest or sympathies, ancillary religious respect for a specific aspect of a religion, and secular equal respect for all religions. Bruce argued that the term "multiple religious belonging" should be strictly confined to being "an observant 'member' of more than one religion (religion here meaning such high level abstractions as Christianity, Islam, Hinduism, Sikhism, Buddhism etc)", and since most religions have strict requirements for and expectations of observant members, sociologists should expect multiple religious belonging, defined in this way, to be "remarkably rare".

See also 

 Christianity and other religions
 Jewish Buddhist
 Religious liberalism
 Religious pluralism
 Syncretism
 Theology of religions

Notes

References

Footnotes

Bibliography 

 
 
 
 
 
 
 
 
 
 
 
 

Religious studies
Relationships between religions
Religious pluralism
World Christianity